Army Group 3 ( 3 [GA 3]) was a French Army formation during the Second World War, stationed along the river Rhine manning the Maginot line.

It was responsible for manning the southern end of the Maginot Line, along the River Rhine and controlled one army. The army group's Commander-in-Chief was  Antoine-Marie-Benoit Besson.

Fortified sectors
Until 16 March 1940, the Altkirch sector was part of the Fortified Region of Belfort. Afterwards, the Altkirch sector was under the command of the 44th Army Fortress Corps under General Tence, which was in turn under the command of the French 8th Army, General Garchery at the Fort de Giromagny, part of Army Group 3. The 44th Corps' headquarters was at Dannemarie. The 67th Infantry Division, commanded by General Boutignon, provided infantry support. The 67th DI was a series B reserve division, not suitable for heavy or sustained combat Following to its reorganization, the sector was called the Defensive Sector of Altkirch.

The SF/SD Altkirch was commanded by General Salvan. Fortress troops were provided by the 12th and 171st Fortress Infantry Regiments. Artillery support was provided by the third and fourth battalions of the 159th Position Artillery Regiment. At the midpoint of the Battle of France on 1 June 1940, the fortress troops of the SF Altkirch amounted to two fortress infantry regiments in five battalions, comprising 165 officers and 3,300 men.

Order of battle
 French 8th Army - General Marcel Garchery
 7th Army Corps 
 13th Infantry Division
 27th Infantry Division
2nd Brigade de Spahis (7th and 9th Algerian Spahi regiments of cavalry (horsed))
 13th Army Corps
 19th Infantry Division
 54th Infantry Division
 104th Infantry Division
 105th Infantry Division
 44th Army Corps (France)
 67th Infantry Division
 Fortified Sector of Altkirch 
 Fortified Sector of Montbéliard 
 Belfort Defences 
45th Fortress Army Corps (HQ Ornans)
57th Infantry Division (France)
63rd Infantry Division 
Jura Central Fortified Sector

References

Mary, Jean-Yves; Hohnadel, Alain; Sicard, Jacques. Hommes et Ouvrages de la Ligne Maginot, Tome 3. Paris, Histoire & Collections, 2003.  (French)
Les Grandes Unités Françaises de la Guerre 1939–1945, Historiques Succincts, Service Historique de l'Armée de Terre, Vincennes : SHAT, 1967

Further reading
 
 
 
 

Army groups of France